Medinipur Sadar Government Polytechnic, established in 2016, is a government polytechnic located in Midnapore, West Bengal.

About college
It is affiliated with the West Bengal State Council of Technical Education, and recognized by AICTE, New Delhi. This polytechnic offers diploma courses in Mechanical, Electrical, and Civil Engineering.

See also

References

External links
Official website WBSCTE
Medinipur Sadar Government Polytechnic

Universities and colleges in Paschim Medinipur district
Educational institutions established in 2014
2014 establishments in West Bengal
Technical universities and colleges in West Bengal